Xining Caojiabao International Airport , also called Caojiapu Airport, is an airport serving Xining, the capital of Qinghai Province, China. The airport began operation in 1991, and in October 2011 a new 3,800 meter long runway was built to replace the old one.

History 
Built on orders of warlord Ma Bufang in 1931, it started limited civilian use in 1933. The only regular route was between Xining and Lanzhou with less than 1,000 passengers annually travelling through the airport. Later, a once-a-week route to Beijing would be added.

In 1975, plans were made to relocate the airport, as the Lejiawan Airport was limited by a one-way gravel runway. Construction of Caojiabao airport was approved by the State Council on 17 May 1985 and started in 1989. The airport opened in December 1991. The site of the former airport is now a military base.

Airlines and destinations

See also
List of airports in China

References

External links
Official website
China West Airport Group website

Airports in Qinghai
Buildings and structures in Xining
Airports established in 1991
1991 establishments in China